Morals at Midnight is a 1930 German romance film directed by Marc Sorkin and starring Gustav Diessl, Camilla Horn and Vladimir Sokoloff.

The film's sets were designed by Heinrich Richter.

Cast
 Gustav Diessl as Brat, ein Gefangener
 Camilla Horn as Nelly Wendt
 Vladimir Sokoloff as Ein Aufseher
 Karl Falkenberg as Zweiter Aufseher
 Michael von Newlinsky as Edgar, Nellys Freund
 Lya Lys as Nora
 Drei Antonys as Drei Clowns

References

Bibliography

External links 
 

1930 films
1930s romance films
Films of the Weimar Republic
German romance films
1930s German-language films
Films directed by Marc Sorkin
German black-and-white films
1930s German films